The women's discus throw at the 2011 Asian Athletics Championships was held at the Kobe Universiade Memorial Stadium on 8 July.

Results

References
Results

2011 Asian Athletics Championships
Discus throw at the Asian Athletics Championships
2011 in women's athletics